Freeport is a city in Brazoria County, Texas, United States, located on the Gulf of Mexico. According to the 2020 census, the city population was 10,696, down from 12,049 in 2010.

History

Freeport was founded as a European-American settlement in November 1912 by the Freeport Sulphur Company. The population was 300. However, by 1929, that population had grown to 3,500, and to 4,100 by 1939, influencing a steady increase of economic expansion in Freeport.

By 1937, a Freeport School District had been established, consisting of several segregated schools and 27 teachers. There were two white schools, one black school, and a white high school.

Freeport's most substantial economic growth began with the construction of Dow Chemical Company facilities in the city during 1939. This company is the community's largest employer. Freeport has the company's largest single manufacturing site in the 21st century.

In July 1957, Freeport merged with Velasco, Texas. This had been a temporary capital of the Republic of Texas during the 19th century. Soon thereafter, Freeport's population numbered 11,619. In 2003, the city annexed nearby Bryan Beach.

Economy
Port Freeport is a seaport on the Gulf of Mexico and is currently ranked 26th in international tonnage. The associated chemical plants provide a stable economy. Freeport is the site of the Dow Chemical Company's Texas Operations facility, which is the company's largest integrated site.

Geography

Freeport is located in southern Brazoria County at  (28.959527, –95.356941), near the mouth of the Brazos River in the Gulf of Mexico. In 2003, the city annexed  of beach bounded on the northeast by the village of Quintana and continuing southwest to the mouth of the Brazos River. This beach is known as Bryan Beach. It is just a few miles away from Surfside and Quintana beaches.

Texas State Highway 36 leads northwest  to Brazoria.

Demographics

As of the 2020 United States census, there were 10,696 people, 4,224 households, and 2,993 families residing in the city.

According to the census numbers as of 2016, there were 12,153 people, 3,788 households with an average of 3.17 persons per household. The median gross rent was $711.00 and the owner-occupied housing rate was 49.5%. The racial makeup of the city was 33.2% non-Hispanic White, 13.9% African American, 0.56% Native American, 0.35% Asian, 0.01% Pacific Islander, 20.91% from other races, and 3.24% from two or more races. Hispanic or Latino of any race were 52.0% of the population. Languages spoken in the household other than English is 49.4%.

The mean travel time to work for workers age 16+ was 15.2 minutes.  In 2012, there were approximately 1,230 businesses in Freeport with women owning 552.

In the city, the median age for females is 29 years old and for males is 28.  34.1% of the population is 18 years of age or younger.

The median income for a household in the city was $36,044. The per capita income for the city was $17,707. About 27.5% of families were below the poverty line.

Government
Freeport is in the 14th congressional district, and is represented by Congressman Randy Weber.

Media
The Brazosport Facts in Clute is a local paper. It was headquartered in Freeport until the move to Clute in 1976.

The Houston Chronicle is the metropolitan area newspaper.

Education

Public education

Schools in Freeport include Brazosport High School (Grades 9–12), Freeport Intermediate School (Grades 7–8), Lanier Middle School (Grades 5–6), Freeport Elementary, and Velasco Elementary School (Grades Pre-K–4). They are all maintained through Brazosport Independent School District.
 The $19.2 million Freeport Elementary facility opened in 2018. VLK Architects designed the building. The student capacity is 750.
 Velasco Elementary was a Kindergarten through grade 4 school until 2017, when it became a grade 2–4 school for all of Freeport. Grades K–1 were moved to O. A. Fleming Elementary, which was scheduled to close in 2018 and be replaced by Freeport Elementary.

Previously Freeport had O.A. Fleming Elementary School (PK–1), and Jane Long Elementary School (grades 2–4). Jane Long was scheduled to close in 2017, with Fleming taking grades K–1 and Velasco Elementary taking over grades 2–4. Fleming was scheduled to close when the new Freeport Elementary School opened in 2018.

Tertiary education

It is within the zone for Brazosport College. The Texas Legislature designated the Brazosport ISD as in the Brazosport College zone.

Libraries

The Freeport Library is a part of the Brazoria County Library System.

Climate
The climate in this area is characterized by hot, humid summers and generally mild to cool winters.  According to the Köppen Climate Classification system, Freeport has a humid subtropical climate, abbreviated "Cfa" on climate maps.

References

External links
 

 City of Freeport official website
 Brazosport ISD
 Port Freeport
 Historic materials about Freeport, hosted by the Portal to Texas History
 Handbook of Texas: Freeport
 The Portal of Texas History
 Brazosport College
 City-Data.com
 Podunk: Profile for Freeport, Texas
 Final Report Freeport Harbor, Texas Channel Improvement Project Communication from the Assistant Secretary, Army, Civil Works, the Department of Defense Transmitting the Freeport Harbor Channel Improvement Project, Brazoria County, Texas Feasibility Report and Environmental Impact Statement, Part 1 Part 2

Cities in Texas
Cities in Brazoria County, Texas
Greater Houston
Populated coastal places in Texas
1912 establishments in Texas
Populated places established in 1912